Jérémy Chardy was the defending champion; however, he lost to Daniel Gimeno Traver in the first round.
Albert Montañés became the new champion, after his victory against Gaël Monfils in the final. Monfils retired during the second set.

Seeds
The top four seeds receive a bye into the second round. 

  Nikolay Davydenko (second round)
  Jürgen Melzer (quarterfinals)
  Gaël Monfils (final, retired due to an ankle injury)
  Juan Carlos Ferrero (semifinals)
  Albert Montañés (champion)
  Philipp Kohlschreiber (first round)
  Gilles Simon (second round)
  Victor Hănescu (first round)

Draw

Finals

Top half

Bottom half

References

External links
Main draw
Qualifying Singles draw

Stuttgart Singles
Singles 2010